Maximiliano Jara Troncoso (August 21, 1886 in Yerbas Buenas – July 6, 1965 in Santiago), better known as Max Jara, was a Chilean poet. He won the Chilean National Prize for Literature in 1956.

He studied medicine at the University of Chile. He worked as a secretary at the university, where he became an administrative deputy manager. He also worked at the newspapers El Mercurio and El Diario Ilustrado in Santiago.

References 
Article at Chile.com
Article at Icarito (R)
Article at Memoria Chilena

1886 births
1965 deaths
Chilean male poets
National Prize for Literature (Chile) winners
20th-century Chilean poets